NSS College of Engineering, Palakkad (Commonly known as NSSCE) is the fourth engineering educational institution established in Kerala, India. It was founded in 1960 by Nair Service Society. NSS College of Engineering is one of the premier institutions in the state. The college is one among the only three Govt-Aided Engineering colleges in Kerala and the first Govt-Aided Engineering College accredited by NBA of AICTE. The college is affiliated to the APJ Abdul Kalam Technological University since its inception in 2015.

The campus is situated in NSS Nagar at Akathethara, 9 km from Palakkad town, and 3 km from the Palakkad Railway Junction. The nearest airports are at Coimbatore (55 km) and Cochin International Airport (110 km). Spread over 100 acres, it includes an administrative block and other blocks, a library block and five hostels including two for women and with good infrastructure.

History

The school was founded in 1960 by Nair Service Society. It is the fourth engineering institute and the second Govt-Aided engineering institute in Kerala. The college started with three branches of engineering viz, Civil Engineering, Mechanical Engineering and Electrical and Electronics Engineering. Instrumentation and Control Engineering, Electronics and Communication Engineering and Computer Science Engineering were started in 1980, 1986 and 1999 respectively. The institution offers M.Tech degree courses from 2011. The college was previously affiliated to University of Kerala from 1960 to 1968 and University of Calicut from 1968 to 2015 until the establishment of APJ Abdul Kalam Technological University.

Academics
The institution offers B.Tech and M.Tech degree courses of the A P J Abdul Kalam Technological University in the various branches of engineering.

Admissions
The institute admits students based on the following entrance exams.
Undergraduate Programs
 Kerala Engineering Entrance Examination, KEAM conducted by the Office of the Commissioner of Entrance Exams run by the Government of Kerala.
Postgraduate Programs
Graduate Aptitude Test in Engineering (GATE) conducted by the Indian Institutes of Technology, IITs. and also students can get admission through previous academic marks (Non gate admission).

In addition to this, a 10% seats are provided for admission to the third semester classes for diploma holders (Lateral entry system)

Alumni
The alumni association has chapters in cities in India including Mumbai, Pune, Bangalore, Chennai, Kozhikode, Palakkad and Kochi. The alumni chapters outside India include Bangalore (NECAB), Qatar (Anecx), Bahrain (NEXSA), UAE (NSSCE) and Kuwait (NSSCEAK) Chapters.

Notable alumni
Prakash Bare, actor, producer
M Sivasankar IAS
Murali Sreeshankar, Athlete 
Ashok Alisheril Thamarakshan, Engineer
Hari Kallikkat, IAS
Vivek Johnson, IAS

Facilities

There are three men's hostel blocks and two women's hostel block with a capacity of 483 and 500 students respectively. The hostels are under direct control of the warden and each hostel has one or two members of the staff of the college as assistant wardens and are responsible to matters connected with the hostel. The Principal is the Ex Officio Chief Warden. There is provision for vegetarian and non-vegetarian food at all the hostels. The hostel mess' are run by the students. The men's hostels are named MH-I, MH-II, MH-III. All the hostels are equipped with high speed WiFi facility.

The central library has a collection of books both academic and general topics.  The computerized Library Information System makes it easy for one to find books. Apart from the central library each department has a separate library which facilitate books to the students of the respective departments. The library facilitates students to browse internet and find books in the digital library.

Technical & Cultural Festivals

Dyuksha (Techno-cultural Fest) 
Dyuksha is a National Techno-cultural festival organized by NSS College of Engineering. It is the successor of Gamaya (last organized in 2014) and has been held in 2018 and 2020. The next edition of Dyuksha (dyuksha 23) is scheduled to be conducted between March 31-April 1, 2023.

Noopuram (Inter-department Arts Fest) 
Noopuram is an annual inter-department arts fest conducted since the college was affiliated to the University of Calicut, and has continued even after the establishment and subsequent affiliation to APJ Abdul Kalam Technological University.

Pelicula (Film Festival) 
Pelicula was a film festival organized  by theatre society of NSSCE. It is now organized by  the film and drama club of NSSCE and is part of the pre-event programs of Dyuksha

Clubs and Activities 
The college has many clubs with very active members. Some of the clubs are listed below

National Service Scheme 
There are two units of NSS(Units 128 &198) at NSS College of Engineering. Both the units are government aided units under the APJ Abdul Kalam Technologicaal University NSS Cell. The units were previously affiliated to the Calicut University NSS Cell. Unit 198 was awarded best unit by University NSS Cell in 2021. The unit has also received Best volunteer and Best Program Officer awards in 2021. Other notable achievements include selection of its volunteer secretary to the NSS Republic Day Parade Camp, 2022.

The units are further divided into 5 functional units: Unarv,Pratheeksha,Samrudhi,Urja and Santhwanam

FOSS NSS(FOSS Cell NSSCE - Free and Open Source Software Cell) 
The FOSS Cell (FOSS NSS) of NSS College of Engineering, Palakkad is a cell for students who like to explore and spread the open-source software ecosystem. Roots of this FOSS Cell dates back to the year 2009.

iEDC 
iEDC NSSCE is one of the topmost Entrepreneurship Development Cell in the state with a motto of "BE YOUR OWN BOSS". It is established with the objective of creating, fostering and promoting the spirit of entrepreneurship among the youth of our college. It is recognized as an Innovation and Entrepreneurship Development Centre by Kerala Startup Mission. The activities of the club gained attention during 2004 and many startups were founded here after.

TinkerHub 
TinkerHub Foundation's campus chapter at NSS College Of Engineering was established in October 2019. The community is dedicated to developing a tech focussed learning culture in the campus through peer-to-peer learning, bootcamps and other events. TinkerHub NSSCE finished at first position in terms of number of submissions from a single campus in the Code-A-Pookalam competition conducted during Onam,2021.

IEEE- SB 
NSS College of Engineering has a very strong and famous IEEE Student's branch in Kerala. They've undertaken many projects during the floods of 2018 and are empowering rural areas with various electrification projects.

Qpounce - Quiz Club 
Qpounce is the Official Quiz Club of NSS College of Engineering. It hosts numerous formal and informal events in the campus including the annual Noopuram Gen Quiz and Monthly informals. The club was brought under the supervision of the College Union in the year 2022.

ELACSTA 
ELACSTA is an Electronics and Communication Department Students Association of NSS College of Engineering, Palakkad. It was formed in the year 2017 by the joint initiative of the faculty and staff members of the department.
The main motive that drives ELASCTA is to help the budding ECE engineers by providing a platform which will help them enrich their technical knowledge through online channels (YouTube), workshops and events held in the college premises.
website

Wildlife & Forestry Club 
Wildlife & Forestry Club was introduced in 1991 ,by a set of students of Electrical and Electronics branch. Aim of the club is to create awareness of nature and its resources.

Reels Club 
The club was formed during the Covid19 pandemic and is successor to the theatre society which was active in campus earlier.

Celestia (Space Club) 
Celestia is the official space club of the college. It is a hobby club working under the college union and conducts various astronomical events.

IIC (Institution's Innovation Council) 
IIC is a unique initiative of MoE's(Ministry of Education) Innovation Cell and is different from other existing models, It aims at streamlining and strengthening the Innovation and startup ecosystem in Higher Education Institutions. IICs is a faculty-experts-student council which takes on multiple activities to promote Innovation and Entrepreneurship round the year. IIC’s objective is to prepare the students with skills like critical thinking, Design Thinking, Innovative thought process and Entrepreneurial mindset.

See also
 List of engineering colleges in Kerala
 List of Educational Institutions of Nair Service Society

References

External links
 Official website

All India Council for Technical Education
Engineering colleges in Kerala
Nair Service Society colleges
Colleges affiliated with the University of Calicut
Universities and colleges in Palakkad district
Educational institutions established in 1960
1960 establishments in Kerala